The following is a list of the buildings on the campus of Fairfield University located in Fairfield, Connecticut.

Academic Buildings

Bannow Science Center (named in honor of university benefactor Rudolph Frederick Bannow)
Berchmans Hall (named in honor of Saint John Berchmans S.J.)
Canisius Hall (named in honor of Saint Petrus Canisius S.J.)
Charles F. Dolan School of Business (named in honor of university benefactor Charles F. Dolan)
David J. Dolan House (named in honor of uncle of university benefactor Charles F. Dolan)
DiMenna-Nyselius Library (named in honor of university benefactors Gustav and Dagmar Nyselius and Joseph A. DiMenna '80)
Donnarumma Hall (named in honor of beloved Politics Professor Carmen Donnarumma)
McAuliffe Hall (named in honor of Bishop Maurice F. McAuliffe)
Center for Nursing and Health Studies
Xavier Hall (named in honor of Saint Francis Xavier S.J. )

Administrative Buildings

Aloysius P. Kelley Center (named in honor of Aloysius P. Kelley S.J., 7th President of Fairfield University)
Alumni House
Bellarmine Hall (named in honor of Saint Robert Bellarmine S.J.)
Central Utility Facility
John C. Dolan Hall (named in honor of uncle of university benefactor Charles F. Dolan)
Southwell Hall (named in honor of Saint Robert Southwell S.J.)
Thomas F. Dolan Commons (named in honor of uncle of university benefactor Charles F. Dolan)

Arts & Entertainment Buildings
Pepsico Theater
Regina A. Quick Center for the Arts (named in honor of wife of university benefactor Leslie C. Quick Jr.)

Athletic Buildings
Alumni Hall
Leslie C. Quick Jr. Recreation Complex (named in honor of university benefactor Leslie C. Quick Jr.)
Walsh Athletic Center (named in honor of university benefactor Thomas J. Walsh Jr.)

Ministry Buildings
Egan Chapel of Saint Ignatius Loyola (named in honor of Saint Ignatius of Loyola S.J.)
Pedro Arrupe, S.J. Campus Ministry Center (named in honor of Pedro Arrupe S.J.)

Residence Halls
70 McCormick Road
Campion Hall (named in honor of Saint Edmund Campion S.J.)
Claver Hall (named in honor of Saint Peter Claver S.J.)
John C. Dolan Hall (named in honor of uncle of university benefactor Charles F. Dolan)
Gonzaga Hall (named in honor of Saint Aloysius Gonzaga S.J.)
Jogues Hall (named in honor of Saint Isaac Jogues S.J.)
Kostka Hall (named in honor of Saint Stanislaus Kostka S.J. )
Loyola Hall (named in honor of Saint Ignatius of Loyola S.J.)
Regis Hall (named in honor of Saint John Francis Regis S.J.)
Village Apartments

Student Life Buildings
Barone Campus Center (named in honor of university Provost and Chemistry Professor Dr. John Barone)
The Levee (derived from the popular 1970s song "American Pie" by Don McLean)

Townhouse Units
#1 de Brebeuf Unit (named in honor of Saint John de Brebeuf S.J. )
#2 Chabanel Unit (named in honor of Saint Noël Chabanel S.J.)
#3 Daniel Unit (named in honor of Saint Anthony Daniel S.J. )
#4 Garnier Unit (named in honor of Saint Charles Garnier S.J.)
#5 Goupil Unit (named in honor of Saint René Goupil S.J.)
#6 de Lalande Unit (named in honor of Saint Jean de Lalande S.J.)
#7 Lalement Unit (named in honor of Saint Gabriel Lallemant S.J.)
#8 de Brito Unit (named in honor of Saint John de Brito S.J.)
#9 Miki Unit (named in honor of Saint Paul Miki S.J.)
#10 Ogilvie Unit (named in honor of Saint John Ogilvie S.J.)
#11 Boscovich Unit (named in honor of Roger Boscovich S.J.)
#12A Clavius Unit (named in honor of Christopher Clavius S.J.)
#12B de Chardin Unit (named in honor of Pierre Teilhard de Chardin S.J.)
#13 Kircher Unit (named in honor of Athanasius Kircher S.J.)
#14 Ricci Unit (named in honor of Matteo Ricci S.J.)
#15 Scheiner Unit (named in honor of Christopher Scheiner S.J.)

External links
Fairfield University Campus Map
Fairfield University Residence Halls
Fairfield University Townhouses
Fairfield University Apartments Complex

Fairfield University
Fairfield University
Fairfield University